Lopa is a genus of kelp flies in the family Coelopidae.

Species
Lopa convexa McAlpine, 1991

References

Coelopidae
Sciomyzoidea genera